Tristan Trager (born August 28, 1999) is an American professional soccer player who plays as a midfielder for USL Championship side Charleston Battery.

Career

Youth and college
Trager attended high school at San Clemente High School, whilst also playing club soccer with Strikers FC Academy. In 2018, Trager attended the United States Air Force Academy and was part of the college soccer team. In four seasons with the Falcons, Trager went on to make 58 appearances, scoring 29 goals and tallying eleven assists. He earned honors including First-team All-WAC in 2019, All-WAC Honorable Mention in 2020–21, and was named Offensive Player of the Year for the Western Athletic Conference and First Team All-WAC for the 2021–22 season.

Professional
On January 11, 2022, Trager was selected 47th overall in the 2022 MLS SuperDraft by Atlanta United. Trager didn't immediately sign with Atlanta, opting instead to see out his senior year with the Air Force. He signed with the club's USL Championship affiliate side Atlanta United 2 on June 1, 2022.

On January 17, 2023, Trager was transferred to USL Championship side Charleston Battery for an undisclosed fee.

References

External links
Air Force profile
Atlanta United profile

1999 births
Living people
Air Force Falcons men's soccer players
American soccer players
Association football midfielders
Atlanta United FC draft picks
Atlanta United 2 players
Charleston Battery players
People from San Clemente, California
Soccer players from California
USL Championship players
Sportspeople from Orange County, California